Oedong  station may refer to:

Oedong station (Gyeongju)
Oedong station (Kaechon)